The Fodero Dining Car Company (1933–1981) was a diner manufacturer located in Newark and later Bloomfield, New Jersey. It was founded by Italian immigrant Joseph Fodero, who formed the company after constructing diners with P. J. Tierney Sons and Kullman Industries.

Fodero diners are known for their stainless steel exteriors and art deco appearance. Diners constructed by the company are located primarily in the Northeastern United States, especially New Jersey, New York, and Pennsylvania.

Many diners constructed by the company remain in operation as of 2010, among them the Empire Diner in Manhattan, New York City, the Agawam Diner in Rowley, Massachusetts, the Edgemere Diner in Shrewsbury, Massachusetts, and the Bound Brook Diner in Bound Brook, New Jersey.

See also

 List of diners

References

External links
Fodero Diners in New Jersey
MACHINES FOR EATING: THE AMERICAN DINER

Construction and civil engineering companies of the United States
Companies based in Essex County, New Jersey
Diner manufacturers
Newark, New Jersey
Bloomfield, New Jersey